Jeroid Johnson (born March 20, 1974 in New Orleans, Louisiana) is a former American football defensive back who played in the Arena Football League. He played college football at Oklahoma State.

Johnson played for the New Jersey Red Dogs, New Jersey / Las Vegas Gladiators, Chicago Rush, Orlando Predators and Tampa Bay Storm.

References

External links
AFL bio

1974 births
Living people
American football cornerbacks
American football safeties
Oklahoma State Cowboys football players
New Jersey Red Dogs players
New Jersey Gladiators players
Las Vegas Gladiators players
Chicago Rush players
Orlando Predators players
Tampa Bay Storm players